ELQ may refer to:

 Ecology Law Quarterly, an environmental law journal
 ELQ, the IATA code for Prince Naif bin Abdulaziz International Airport, Buraidah, Saudi Arabia